Zephyrhills West is a census-designated place (CDP) in Pasco County, Florida, United States.  The population was 5,242 at the 2000 census.

Geography
Zephyrhills West is located at  (28.232755, -82.204859).

Demographics

As of the census of 2000, there were 5,242 people, 2,803 households, and 1,749 families residing in the CDP. The racial makeup of the CDP was 97.60% White, 0.23% African American, 0.34% Native American, 0.50% Asian, 0.02% Pacific Islander, 0.40% from other races, and 0.92% from two or more races. Hispanic or Latino of any race were 2.08% of the population.

There were 2,803 households, out of which 8.3% had children under the age of 18 living with them, 56.4% were married couples living together, 4.4% had a female householder with no husband present, and 37.6% were non-families. 34.0% of all households were made up of individuals, and 25.0% had someone living alone who was 65 years of age or older.  The average household size was 1.87 and the average family size was 2.31.

In the CDP, the population was spread out, with 9.0% under the age of 18, 2.2% from 18 to 24, 11.8% from 25 to 44, 20.5% from 45 to 64, and 56.4% who were 65 years of age or older.  The median age was 68 years. For every 100 females, there were 86.3 males.  For every 100 females age 18 and over, there were 85.5 males.

The median income for a household in the CDP was $26,195, and the median income for a family was $29,451. Males had a median income of $27,663 versus $21,346 for females. The per capita income for the CDP was $19,921.  About 8.4% of families and 10.7% of the population were below the poverty line, including 30.5% of those under age 18 and 6.4% of those age 65 or over.

References

Census-designated places in Pasco County, Florida
Census-designated places in Florida